Post Office Building may refer to:

China
General Post Office Building, Shanghai

United States
Any one of numerous buildings listed at List of United States post offices

See also
 General Post Office (disambiguation)